Up Sydling is a hamlet in west Dorset, England. It is situated at the head of Sydling Water, a tributary of the River Frome, ten miles north of Dorchester. The hamlet is in the parish of Sydling St Nicholas, about a mile north of the village.

References

Villages in Dorset